The 1949 Wayne Tartars football team represented Wayne University (later renamed Wayne State University) as an independent during the 1949 college football season. Under first-year head coach Louis F. Zarza, the team compiled a 3–5 record.

Schedule

References

Wayne
Wayne State Warriors football seasons
Wayne Tartars football